Chard Reservoir is a  reservoir north east of Chard Somerset, England. It is owned and managed by South Somerset District Council and is a recipient of the Green Flag Award.

It was built on the river Isle in 1842 to provide water for the Chard Canal.

It is a Local Nature Reserve. It is used for dog walking, fishing and birdwatching, with a bird hide having been installed. Birds which are spotted regularly include herons, egrets, kingfishers, cormorants, grebes, gulls, ducks and also a wide range of woodland birds such as nuthatch, treecreeper and woodpeckers. Rarities have included ring-necked duck, great white egret, cattle egret and yellow-browed warbler.

The water is stocked with carp.

References

External links

Reservoirs in Somerset
Local Nature Reserves in Somerset
Chard, Somerset